Mobility is a city-building simulation video game developed by Glamus as an initiative of DaimlerChrysler, with scientific data done by the Bauhaus-Universität Weimar. It is similar to SimCity, in that the game involves successfully developing a town into a larger metropolis; however, the focus is more on the ability of the citizens to use transportation to get around the area (hence the name).

Very fine control of traffic flow is given to the player — details all the way down to speed limits and right-of-way at intersections are options that can be selected in-game. Due to Mobility's focus on getting around, most of the structures that can be built are dedicated to transportation, such as bus stops, parking decks, and train stations, although there are other basic gameplay items such as zones.

The current Microsoft Windows version is 3.02, released on 26 October 2012. The Linux version is still limited to 2.00. It is released as shareware, available on the Mobility Web site. The cost of registration varies by country.

External links
Official website

General References
 
 
 

City-building games
Linux games
2001 video games
Video games developed in Germany
Windows games
Business simulation games